Boomerang is a 2001 Serbian comedy film directed by Dragan Marinković.

Cast 
 Lazar Ristovski – Bobi
 Paulina Manov – Olga
 Nebojša Glogovac – Miki
 Dragan Jovanović – Toni
 Petar Božović – Inspector Trtović
 Milena Dravić – Mrs. Jeftić
 Nikola Đuričko – Stampedo
 Zoran Cvijanović – Man who loses his watch
 Tijana Kondic – Slavica
 Vojin Ćetković – Zgodni
 Rambo Amadeus – Mutavi 
 Maja Sabljić – Stanislava
 Nikola Kojo – Pavle
 Danica Ristovski – Ciganka
 Nikola Simić – Aprcović

References

External links 

2001 comedy films
2001 films
Serbian comedy films
Films set in Serbia
Films shot in Serbia
2000s Serbian-language films
Films about the Serbian Mafia